The 1959 Ontario general election was held on June 11, 1959, to elect the 98 members of the 26th Legislative Assembly of Ontario (Members of Provincial Parliament, or "MPPs") of the Province of Ontario.

The Ontario Progressive Conservative Party, led by Leslie Frost, won a sixth consecutive term in office, and maintained its majority in the legislature, although it lost 12 of the 83 seats it had won in the previous election.

The Ontario Liberal Party, led by John Wintermeyer, increased its caucus from 11 to 22 members, and continued in the role of official opposition. Liberal-Labour MPP Albert Wren was re-elected and continued to sit with the Liberal caucus. Wren died in 1961 and was succeeded in a by-election by Robert Gibson.

The social democratic Co-operative Commonwealth Federation (CCF), led by Donald C. MacDonald, won two additional seats, for a total of five.

Results

|-
! colspan=2 rowspan=2 | Political party
! rowspan=2 | Party leader
! colspan=5 | MPPs
! colspan=3 | Votes
|-
! Candidates
!1955
!Dissol.
!1959
!±
!#
!%
! ± (pp)

|style="text-align:left;"|Leslie Frost
|98
|83
|
|71
|12
|868,815
|46.15%
|1.91

|style="text-align:left;"|John Wintermeyer
|97
|10
|
|21
|11
|682,589
|36.26%
|3.46

|style="text-align:left;"|Donald C. MacDonald
|80
|3
|
|5
|2
|313,834
|16.67%
|0.13

|style="text-align:left;"|
|1
|1
|
|1
|
|6,559
|0.35%
|0.06

|style="text-align:left;"|
|2
|1
|
|–
|1
|2,119
|0.11%
|0.29

|style="text-align:left;"|Bruce Magnuson
|9
|–
|–
|–
|
|4,304
|0.23%
|0.96

|style="text-align:left;"|
|5
|–
|–
|–
|
|1,740
|0.09%
|

|style="text-align:left;"|
|1
|–
|–
|–
|
|1,512
|0.08%
|

|style="text-align:left;"|
|2
|–
|–
|–
|
|832
|0.04%
|0.48

|style="text-align:left;"|
|1
|–
|–
|–
|
|268
|0.01%
|

|style="text-align:left;"|
|
|–
|–
|–
|
|colspan="3"|Did not campaign

|style="text-align:left;"|
|
|–
|–
|–
|
|colspan="3"|Did not campaign

|style="text-align:left;"|Socialist-Labour
|style="text-align:left;"|
|
|–
|–
|–
|
|colspan="3"|Did not campaign

|colspan="3"|
|
|colspan="5"|
|-style="background:#E9E9E9;"
|colspan="3" style="text-align:left;"|Total
|296
|98
|98
|98
|
|1,882,572
|100.00%
|
|-
|colspan="8" style="text-align:left;"|Blank and invalid ballots
|align="right"|21,272
|style="background:#E9E9E9;" colspan="2"|
|-style="background:#E9E9E9;"
|colspan="8" style="text-align:left;"|Registered voters / turnout
|3,187,801
|59.72%
|1.68
|}

Seats that changed hands

There were 14 seats that changed allegiance in the election.

 PC to Liberal
Bracondale
Dovercourt
Fort William
Niagara Falls
Nipissing
Parkdale
Sudbury
Wentworth
Windsor—Sandwich
Windsor—Walkerville
York Centre

 PC to CCF
Hamilton East
Woodbine

 Independent-PC to PC
Renfrew South

See also
Politics of Ontario
List of Ontario political parties
Premier of Ontario
Leader of the Opposition (Ontario)

References

1959 elections in Canada
1959
1959 in Ontario
June 1959 events in Canada